Peterskirche (St. Peter's Church) is a church in the municipality of Efringen-Kirchen, Baden-Württemberg in south-west of Germany. It was first mentioned in 1173. The current late-Gothic religious building was constructed in 1457 and contains a notable series of paintings from the 15th century. The paintings are Fresco-secco style.

References 

Blansingen
Blansingen
Blansingen
Blansingen
Gothic architecture in Germany
Lutheran churches converted from Roman Catholicism
15th-century churches in Germany